Jack Daugherty may refer to:

 Jack Daugherty (baseball) (born 1960), Major League Baseball player for seven seasons
 Jack Daugherty (musician), musician and producer for The Carpenters

See also
John Dougherty (disambiguation)